The Atchison, Topeka, and Santa Fe Railroad Depot in Los Lunas, New Mexico was built in 1879.  It was listed on the National Register of Historic Places in 1979.

The depot was moved in 1976 to its current location.

It is notable as one of the oldest depots in New Mexico, and is the oldest in the state of its standard type used by the A.T. & S.F. throughout the late 1800s.

Signage in 2016 indicates it is currently a Veterans of Foreign Wars post.

References

National Register of Historic Places in Valencia County, New Mexico
Buildings and structures completed in 1879